Krefeld Hauptbahnhof is the largest station of the city of Krefeld in the German state of North Rhine-Westphalia. The double-track and electrified Duisburg-Ruhrort–Mönchengladbach railway (KBS 425) and the Lower Left Rhine Railway (KBS 495) cross at the station.

History
The station was opened in 1847. From 1906 to 1909, the line and the station were elevated to raise the railway tracks above the streets in the urban area. Around this time, the station was renamed Krefeld Hauptbahnhof (main station). Until 1950, there was also a nearby station of the Crefelder Eisenbahn-Gesellschaft (Krefeld Railway Company, later spelt with an initial "K", CEC); its line to Rheydt used the route now occupied by federal highway 9. This Krefeld Süd (south) station was rebuilt during the elevation of the tracks to the south of the main station, but the trains did not run into the main station. The line to Rheydt now only extends as far as the Krefeld steelworks as a siding. Previously there was also a connection to the line to Hülser Berg (part of the Viersen–Moers line, which is now partly operated as the Schluff museum railway). The line to Hülser Berg is still connected to Krefeld station by a slightly longer route.

Deutsche Bahn classifies it as a category 3 station. Krefeld is not served by long-distance trains and the city is one of the largest in Germany that is only served by regional trains. The nearest stations with a variety of long-distance services are Duisburg and Düsseldorf.

Krefeld no longer has a significant role as railway node since the closure of the large Hohenbudberg marshalling yard (on the line to Duisburg, just outside the city limits) and the freight yard located east of the station and the abandonment of long-distance passenger services. There is still an important maintenance facility in Krefeld-Oppum, including for the servicing of Intercity-Express trains.

Services 
The Duisburg–Mönchengladbach line is usually served every hour by the Regional-Express service RE 42 (Niers-Haard-Express) and Regionalbahn services RB 33 (Rhein-Niers-Bahn) and RB 35 (Emscher-Niederrhein-Bahn). The Lower Rhine line is served every half hour by RE 10 (Niers-Express) between Kleve and Düsseldorf  and every hour by the RE 7 (Rhein-Münsterland-Express) between Krefeld and Cologne.

In addition to the railway lines, the station is served by nine bus lines and four tram lines of SWK MOBIL and another three bus lines of Regionalverkehr Niederrhein (Lower Rhine Regional Transport), which are organised by the Verkehrsgemeinschaft Niederrhein (Transport Community of the Lower Rhine). In addition, the station is also served by two lines of the Düsseldorf Stadtbahn, operated by Rheinbahn.

References

Railway stations in North Rhine-Westphalia
Buildings and structures in Krefeld
Railway stations in Germany opened in 1849